Presidential elections were held in South Korea on 6 December 1979 following the assassination of Park Chung Hee on 26 October. The members of the National Conference for Unification, who among other things, were responsible for election of president, choose Prime Minister Choi Kyu-hah as the President of the Republic of Korea unopposed; Choi had been acting President since Park's death. 

President Choi was supposed to serve for the remainder of late President Park's term, which would have ended in 1984. However, a coup d'état took place six days after the elections, with Chun Doo-hwan seizing power. He allowed Choi to remain in power for eight months, before being elected president in August 1980.

Results
In order to be elected, a candidate had to receive the vote of over 50% of the incumbent members of the National Conference for Unification. With 2,560 delegates present, Choi had to receive at least 1,281 votes to be elected. He received 2,465 votes, 96.29% of the total possible.

By region

References

South Korea
President
Presidential elections in South Korea
Single-candidate elections
Choi Kyu-hah
South Korea